Liane Lissa Sato (born September 9, 1964 in Santa Monica, California) is a retired female volleyball player from the United States, who won the bronze medal with the USA National Team at the 1992 Summer Olympics in Barcelona, Spain. She also competed at the 1988 Summer Olympics, finishing in seventh place.

Her brother Eric also played volleyball in both the 1988 and 1992 Olympic games, capturing a gold medal in 1988 and a bronze medal in 1992.

She now teaches and coaches volleyball at her alma mater, Santa Monica High School in Santa Monica, California.

References

 
 

1964 births
Living people
American women's volleyball players
Volleyball players at the 1988 Summer Olympics
Volleyball players at the 1992 Summer Olympics
Olympic bronze medalists for the United States in volleyball
Sportspeople from Santa Monica, California
Place of birth missing (living people)
American sportspeople of Japanese descent
Medalists at the 1992 Summer Olympics
21st-century American women
San Diego State Aztecs women's volleyball players